Carrot salad is a salad made with carrots. Recipes for carrot salad vary widely by regional cuisine. Shredded carrot is often used. Shredded carrot salads are often used as a topping for other dishes.

By country

America 
"Carrot raisin salad" is a traditional dish in the Southern United States. Grated carrot is mixed with raisins, mayonnaise dressing, granulated sugar, salt and black pepper. 

In Brazilian cuisine, churrasco service often includes potato salad and carrot salad made with mayonnaise, raw onion, green peas, sweetcorn or sometimes chayote squashes.

Asia 
The Koryo-saram, ethnic Koreans in the post-Soviet Union states, popularized spicy pickled carrot salad, known throughout the Soviet Union as Korean-style carrots. It is said to have been unknown in South Korea until recently, but has gained an international following and is served in many cafeterias throughout the CIS where it is also sold in supermarkets, and featured regularly as a side dish on dinner tables and at holiday feasts set by many ethnicities of the former Soviet Union.

In Russia, doner kebab often includes carrot salad as an accompaniment to the meat.

In India, carrot salads are often made with grated carrots are cooked with mustard seeds and green chillies in hot oil.

Europe 
In Bulgarian cuisine a salad with carrots and cabbage is traditional.

Carrot salad is eaten across the Middle East most commonly by mixing carrots with parsley and lemon juice.

Surówka z Marchewki is a Polish cuisine carrot salad made with carrots, Granny Smith apple, lemon juice, sunflower oil or vegetable oil, salt, and sugar.

In France, carottes râpées (or salade de carottes râpées) is a grated carrot salad made with whole-grain mustard.

Africa 
Houria is a cooked, and often mashed, carrot salad in Tunisian cuisine.

In Morocco, carrot salad is  made by mixing cooked carrots with lemon juice and cumin and oftentimes herbs and garlic.

Macedonia is a dish that was represented in the 1940s and 1950s in north Africa and Québec (Québec City especially) with cans "de la macédoine" of diced carrots and peas.

See also

 List of carrot dishes
 List of salads

References

Salads
Carrot dishes
Vegetarian cuisine